Andrew Simmons is a wrestler.

Andrew Simmons may also refer to:

Andrew Simmons (environmentalist)
Andrew Simmons (journalist)
Andrew Simmons, character in Ann Carver's Profession

See also
Andrew Symonds, cricketer